La La Peace Song is a 1974 album by American singer Al Wilson. It came out in the same year as O. C. Smith's album of the same name. Both contain renditions of the song "La La Peace Song", and both albums were co-produced by Johnny Bristol.

A full-page ad for Al Wilson's single "La La Peace Song" appeared on page 75 of the September 28, 1974 issue of Billboard. A section of the page also featured his album. On the following page 76, O. C. Smith's single "La La Peace Song" had just entered the Hot 100 chart at 91.

Wilson's album was produced by Johnny Bristol, Jerry Fuller and Steve Cropper. It got a decent review in the October 5, 1974 issue of Billboard with the strong backup instrumentals being noted. Also the reviewer mentioned that it was full of potential singles, with the picks being "La La Peace Song", "Passport", "I'm A Weak Man", "The Longer We Stay Together" and "Willoughby Brook Road".  By November 30, 1974, it was at its sixth week in the Soul chart and had moved up one from 37 to no 36. By January 4, 1975, it had spent 11 weeks in the Soul Chart and had dropped from 47 to 56.

Track listing

References

1974 albums
Albums produced by Johnny Bristol